KSLO AM 1230  is a Catholic radio station licensed to Opelousas, Louisiana. KSLO simulcasts the programming of KLFT 90.5 in Kaplan, Louisiana. KSLO is owned by Delta Media Corporation. KSLO's studios are located on Evangeline Thruway in Carencro, and its transmitter is located in Opelousas.

History
KSLO was Opelousas' first radio station, beginning broadcasting September 21, 1947, on 1230 kHz with a power of 250 watts. The station was owned and operated by Hugh O. Jones and W. Eugene Jones. It was affiliated with the Mutual network and used the United Press news service and World Broadcasting System transcriptions.

Simulcast
KSLO simulcasts the programming of 90.5 KLFT in Kaplan, Louisiana.

References

External links

Catholic radio stations
Opelousas, Louisiana
Radio stations established in 1947
1947 establishments in Louisiana
Christian radio stations in Louisiana
Catholic Church in Louisiana